Chester Plummer (1945 – July 25, 1976) was a taxi driver in the Washington, D.C. area of the United States who attempted to invade the White House.

Plummer was one of nine children and played football in high school in Washington, D.C.

At about 9:30 at night on July 25, 1976, Plummer scaled the White House fence, armed with a piece of pipe.      While advancing towards the White House, he was ordered to stop by a Secret Service officer. After ignoring the order, he was shot by a rookie officer, and died 90 minutes later in hospital. He was the first known shooting victim on White House grounds.  It is unknown whether Plummer intended to attack President Gerald Ford or had another motive.

Plummer was a decorated Army veteran and former high school football star who had recently undergone a divorce and a separation from another relationship. He was on one year's probation for an indecent exposure charge at the time of his death and a psychiatrist had posited he had impulsivity issues stemming from marital problems. His father had also pressed assault charges against him in 1972 and then dropped them. His employer said he was "apolitical" and "quiet". Co-workers described him as "nice" and "quiet" and one of them felt Chester Plummer may have been looking for a way to commit suicide. His father said he felt favorably toward President Ford.  His was the fifth major intrusion onto White House grounds during Ford's presidency.  President Ford was in the White House at the time Plummer was shot.

References

See also
Guard Kills Intruder on White House Lawn, The Miami News, July 26, 1976.
Intruder's Motive Still a Mystery, The Palm Beach Post, July 27, 1976.
Nice Guy Killed at White House, The Evening Independent, July 26, 1976.

1976 deaths
American taxi drivers
Deaths by firearm in Washington, D.C.
People shot dead by law enforcement officers in the United States
White House intruders
1945 births